Priotrochatella is a genus of land snails with an operculum, terrestrial gastropod mollusks in the family Helicinidae. Priotroachatella occur on calcareous rocks and in caves in the same rocks on Cuban islands - they are critically endangered because of the exploitation of the marble quarries that form their habitat.

Species 
Species within the genus Priotrochatella include:
 Priotrochatella constellata (Morelet, 1847)
 Priotrochatella stellata (Velazquez in Poey, 1852)
 Priotrochatella torrei Clapp, 1918

References 

Helicinidae